Palo santo (Spanish for sacred stick or holy wood etc.) may refer to:

Trees
 Lignum vitae, heartwood of tree species of the genus Guaiacum, native to subtropical and tropical regions of the Americas
 Bulnesia sarmientoi, a tree species native to the Gran Chaco area in South America
 Bursera graveolens, a tree species native to South America, used for incense, aromatic oil, and indigenous medicine

Other uses
 Palo Santo (Shearwater album), a 2006 album by indie rock band Shearwater, or the title track
 Palo Santo (Years & Years album), a 2018 album by British band Years & Years, or the title track

See also

 Holy Wood (disambiguation)
 
 
 Santo (disambiguation)
 Palo (disambiguation)